Walter Goodall (6 November 1830 – 14 May 1889) was an English watercolour painter.

Life
He was youngest son of Edward Goodall, the engraver, and brother of the artists Frederick Goodall and Edward Angelo Goodall. He studied in the school of design at Somerset House and at the Royal Academy.

About fourteen years before his death Goodall had a paralytic seizure, from which he never quite recovered, and during the last few years of his life was unable to practise his art. He died on 14 May 1889, in his fifty-ninth year, leaving a widow and three children.

Works
In 1852 Goodall exhibited three drawings at the Royal Academy. In 1853 he became an associate of the (Old) Society of Painters in Water-colours, and continued to be a frequent exhibitor in Pall Mall; in 1862 he became a full member of that society. He was a constant exhibitor at the Royal Manchester Institution and all the principal water-colour exhibitions. Some of his best work was shown at the exhibition of watercolours at Manchester in 1861. His Lottery Ticket was exhibited at the Philadelphia Centennial Exhibition in 1876.

Goodall typically painted small subject-pictures, such as The Daydream, The Cradle Song, Waiting for the Ferry-boat, and The Tired Lace-maker. A number of these were lithographed in a series entitled Walter Goodall's Rustic Sketches. Goodall also made drawings from pictures in the Vernon Gallery for engravings published in The Art Journal.

Notes

Attribution

1830 births
1889 deaths
19th-century English painters
English male painters
19th-century English male artists